The 2022 Interwetten International Darts Open was the first of thirteen PDC European Tour events on the 2022 PDC Pro Tour. The tournament took place at the SACHSENarena, Riesa from 25 to 27 February 2022. It featured a field of 48 players and £140,000 in prize money, with £25,000 going to the winner.

Joe Cullen was the defending champion after defeating Michael van Gerwen 8–5 in the 2020 final, but lost to Nathan Aspinall in the third round.

Gerwyn Price won his sixth European Tour title after beating Peter Wright 8–4 in the final, retaining his status as world number one, which he would have surrendered to Wright had he lost.

Prize money
The prize money was unchanged from the European Tours of the last 3 years:

 Seeded players who lose in the second round of the event shall not be credited with prize money on any Order of Merit. A player who qualifies as a qualifier, but later becomes a seed due to the withdrawal of one or more other players shall be credited with their prize money on all Orders of Merit regardless of how far they progress in the event.

Qualification and format
The top 16 entrants from the PDC ProTour Order of Merit on 28 June 2021 automatically qualified for the event and were seeded in the second round.

The remaining 32 places went to players from six qualifying events – 24 from the Tour Card Holder Qualifier (held on 9 July 2021), one from the Associate Member Qualifiers (held on 5 July 2021 and 23 February), four from the Host Nation Qualifier (held on 24 February), one from the Nordic & Baltic Associate Member Qualifier (held in 2021), and one from the East European Associate Member Qualifier (held in 2021).

As three qualifying events were held in 2021, but only two actual events were held, the qualifiers for the third event of 2021 were carried over to the first event of 2022. This resulted in Wayne Jones competing as a Tour Card holder despite having lost his Tour Card. Players who had entered either of the qualifiers that took place in 2021 were not eligible to enter a qualifier in 2022; and players who had gained a Tour Card since the 2021 qualifier were eligible to enter the Associate Member qualifier for this event.

Ryan Joyce withdrew prior to the event. A fifth place was made available to the Host Nation Qualifier.

The following players took part in the tournament:

Top 16
  (third round)
  (second round)
  (runner-up)
  (third round)
  (champion)
  (quarter-finals)
  (semi-finals)
  (quarter-finals)
  (second round)
  (second round)
  (third round)
  (third round)
  (quarter-finals)
  (second round)
  (second round)
  (semi-finals)

Tour Card Qualifier
  (third round)
  (first round)
  (quarter-finals)
  (first round)
  (first round)
  (second round)
  (first round)
  (second round)
  (second round)
  (second round)
  (second round)
  (second round)
  (second round)
  (first round)
  (first round)
  (first round)
  (second round)
  (second round)
  (third round)
  (first round)
  (first round)
  (second round)
  (first round)

Associate Member Qualifier
  (first round)
  (third round)

Host Nation Qualifier
  (first round)
  (third round)
  (first round)
  (first round)
  (second round)

Nordic & Baltic Qualifier
  (first round)

East European Qualifier
  (first round)

Draw

Notes

References

2022 PDC Pro Tour
2022 PDC European Tour
2022 in German sport
International Darts Open